Francesco Ventretti (1713–1784) was an Italian mathematician.

Life 
Ventretti taught at the Military College of Verona and in 1773 invented the orosmeter, a tool to make precision measurements of hillside gradients.

Gaetano Marzagaglia commented on his works.

Works

References 

Italian mathematicians